Ushkonyr (Üşqoñyr), formerly known as Shamalgan (Şamalğan) or Chemolgan, is a rural community near Almaty in Kazakhstan. It is notable as the birthplace of former Kazakh president Nursultan Nazarbayev.

References

Populated places in Almaty Region